Greer Barnes may refer to:

 Greer Barnes (soccer) (born 1987), female American soccer defender
 Greer Barnes (comedian) (born 1964), male American comedian and actor